Godalming   is a market town and civil parish in southwest Surrey, England, around  southwest of central London. It is in the Borough of Waverley, at the confluence of the Rivers Wey and Ock. Much of the area lies on the strata of the Lower Greensand Group and Bargate stone was quarried locally until the Second World War.

The earliest evidence of human activity is from the Paleolithic and the River Wey floodplain at Charterhouse was settled in the middle Iron Age and Roman period. The modern town is believed to have its origins in the 6th or early 7th centuries and its name is thought to derive from that of a Saxon landowner. Kersey, a woollen cloth, dyed blue, was produced at Godalming for much of the Middle Ages, but the industry declined in the early modern period. In the 17th century, the town began to specialise in the production of knitted textiles and in the manufacture of hosiery in particular.

Throughout its history, Godalming has benefitted from its location on the main route from London to Portsmouth Dockyard. Local transport links were improved from the early 18th century with the opening of the turnpike road through the town in 1749 and the construction of the Godalming Navigation in 1764. Expansion of the settlement began in the mid-19th century, stimulated by the opening of the first railway station in 1847 and the relocation of Charterhouse School from London in 1872. The town has a claim to be the first place in the world to have a combined public and private electricity supply.

Several buildings in the town centre date from the 16th and 17th centuries. The distinctive Pepperpot was built in 1814 to replace the medieval market house and the upper floor was used as a council chamber. James Oglethorpe, the founder of the Colony of Georgia, was born in Godalming in 1696 and the town maintains a friendship with the U.S. state and the cities of Savannah and Augusta in particular.

Toponymy
The oldest surviving record of Godalming is from a  copy of the  will of Alfred the Great, in which the settlement appears as Godelmingum. The name is written as Godelminge in Domesday Book and later as Godelminges, Godhelming, Godalminges and Godalmyn.The second part of the name is thought to derive from the Old English ingas and means "people of" or "family of" and the first may refer to a Anglo-Saxon individual called Godhelm. Thomas William Shore (18401905) suggested that Godhelm may be of Gothic origin and Robert Eugen Zachrisson (18801937) suggested that Godhelm may have been an early name for the River Ock or another local stream. Residents of Godalming are sometimes called "Godhelmians".

The first records of Binscombe and Busbridge are from the 13th century, when they appear as Budenscombe and Bursbrige respectively. They are thought to derive from individuals called Byden and Beohrtsige, names both found in Old English. Catteshall may mean "hill of the wild cat" or "hill belonging to a person called Catt". Farncombe appears in Domesday Book as Fearnecombe and is thought to mean "valley of the ferns". Frith Hill may derive from the Middle English frith, meaning "woodland".

Geography

Location and topography
The town centre is to the south of the River Wey, close to its confluence with the River Ock. The Weald, a remnant forest of small wooded settlements, adjoins the town to the south-west.

Elevations vary between  AOD by the Guildford Road Rugby Union ground and Broadwater lake at the River Wey's exit from Godalming into Peasmarsh, Shalford, and  AOD where Quarter Mile meets Hambledon Road (both residential) in the south-east. Hurtmore Road is also residential: Upper Green/Hurtmore is at  AOD. Immediately north and south of the town centre, steep hills reach  AOD from  AOD in the town centre itself.

Geology
Godalming lies on the northwestern side of the Weald and primarily sits on the strata of the Lower Greensand Group, which were laid down in the early Cretaceous. Atherfield Clay is found in the extreme north of the civil parish at Binscombe, where there was a former brickworks. Holloway Hill and much of the town centre are on the Hythe Beds, a loamy, fine-grained sandy layer that also includes some sandstone and chert. Although rare elsewhere in these strata, fossils of mollusc species occur in these beds in the Godalming area, including the bivalves Ostrea macroptera and Exogyra sinuata, and the brachiopods Rhynchonella parvirostris and Waldheimia tamarindus.

Frith Hill and Charterhouse are on the iron-rich Bargate Beds, a part of the more widespread lower Sandgate Formation that is only found in the Godalming area. This layer contains Bargate stone, a dark honey-coloured calcerous sandstone that was quarried until the Second World War at several sites in the civil parish. There are also small exposures of the sandy Folkestone Beds at Busbridge and to the northwest of Charterhouse. River gravels are found in the valleys of the Wey and Ock to the west and south of the town centre, and as a terrace at Farncombe. Alluvial deposits of sand and silt are found in the floodplain of the Wey, especially between Bridge Street and Catteshall.

History

Early history

The earliest evidence of human activity in the Godalming area is from the Stone Age. At least two Paleolithic hand axes as well as Mesolithic flint blades and flakes have been found in the civil parish. In 2017, a local schoolboy found a Bronze Age barbed and tanged arrowhead, which he subsequently donated to Godalming Museum. The higher ground above the River Wey floodplain at Charterhouse was occupied during the middle Iron Age and human habitation is thought to have continued into the early Roman period. There is thought to have been a small farmstead on the site in the late first century C.E. and there was a villa at Binscombe.

The Anglo-Saxon settlement at Godalming is thought to have been founded in the 6th or early 7th centuries, in the area surrounding the parish church. The earliest documentary evidence for Godalming, is from the will of Alfred the Great in 880, in which the settlement and surrounding land is left to his nephew, Æthelwold ætheling. By the end of the Anglo-Saxon period, the town was the administrative centre of the Godalming Hundred, which stretched from Puttenham in the northwest to Chiddingfold in the southeast.

Governance
The town appears as Godelminge in Domesday Book; in 1086 it was held by Ranulf Flambard, who also held Tuesley and parts of Guildford. The manor had sufficient land for 25 plough teams. It included 40 acres of meadow, woodland for 103 swine, three mills, two churches, and generated an annual income of £34. Farncombe appears in Domesday book as Fernecome and was held by Odo of Bayeux.

At some point in the late 11th century, the Manor of Godalming was divided into two parts. The King's Manor was held by the Crown through the 12th century. There is evidence to suggest that it was held by Stephen de Turnham in 1206, but in 1221 it was granted to the Bishop of Salisbury by Henry III. It was held by the Bishop until 1541, when it was conveyed to Thomas Paston, who returned it to the Crown the following year. It was held by the monarch through the Tudor period until 1601, when Elizabeth I sold it to George More of Loseley Park.

The second part of the Manor of Godalming, known as the Rectory Manor or Deanshold, was granted to Salisbury Cathedral by Henry I in the early 12th century. It remained in the custodianship of the Dean and Chapter until the mid-19th century. For much of its history, the manor was leased by the Castillion family, but was held by the Ogelthorpe family in the 18th century. In 1846, the Rectory Manor was transferred to the Ecclesiastical Commissioners, who began to break up and sell off the estate in the early 1860s.

The first charter to be granted to Godalming was issued by Edward I on 7 June 1300. In it, he authorised a weekly market and a three-day annual fair on the Feast of Saints Peter and Paul in late June. The right to hold a market was confirmed by Elizabeth I in 1563 and, in January 1575, the Queen issued a Charter of Incorporation, enabling Godalming to become a self-governing borough. The charter specified that a "warden" (effectively a mayor) should be elected by the town each year at Michaelmas.  In 1620, Francis Bacon, the Lord Chancellor under James I, issued a document entitled "Ordinances and constitutions made and established for the better and government of the Town of Godalming in the County of Surry", which specified that the administration of the town should be the responsibility of the Warden and eight assistants. It also provided for the appointment of a bailiff and restricted the amount of time that townspeople could spend in local inns and hostelries.

The modern system of local government began to emerge in the first half of the 19th century. Under the Municipal Corporations Act 1835, the town became a borough corporation under the control of a Mayor and elected councillors. The following year, the Guildford Poor Law Union was formed, with responsibility for a total area of  stretching from Godalming to Woking. As a result of the Local Government Act 1888, several responsibilities were transferred from the borough to the newly formed Surrey County Council. Farncombe was originally a separate civil parish, but became part of Godalming borough in 1892. The most recent change in local government took place in 1974, when the municipal boroughs of Godalming and Haslemere were merged with the Farnham Urban District and Hambledon Rural District to form Waverley District. At the same time, Godalming Town Council was constituted as the lowest tier of local government in the civil parish.

Commerce and industry
The right to hold a market was granted to Godalming in 1300 by Edward I. It probably took place each week at the junction of Church Street and the High Street. The right was confirmed in the 1563 charter of Elizabeth I, which stipulated that the market should be held every Wednesday. In 1674, the day was changed to Friday, but had reverted to Wednesday by the start of the 19th century. The market ceased in around 1879. The right to hold an fair each July was also granted in the charter of 1300 and continued to be held until 1870. A second annual fair, to take place over three days around Candlemas in February, was granted by Elizabeth I. By the start of the 19th century, the fair had been reduced to a single day and is last recorded in 1910.

Three watermills are recorded in the entry for Godalming in Domesday Book. Although their identities are uncertain, the present day Catteshall, Hatch and Westbrook Mills on the River Wey are thought to be the likely locations. Hatch Mill, close to the parish church, may be the oldest mill site in Godalming. Catteshall Mill, to the northeast of the town centre, is first recorded in 1300 and was used for milling corn from  until 1836.

Godalming's medieval prosperity was founded on the wool trade. The North Downs provided good grazing land for sheep, there were local deposits of Fuller's earth in Surrey and the Wey provided a source of both water and power for fulling mills. Like Guildford, to the north, the town specialised in the manufacture of kersey, a coarse cloth, dyed blue. Fulling took place at Catteshall Mill between 1300 and 1660, and at the Westbrook Mills in the 17th and early-18th centuries. Dyers are known to have been active in the town in the 17th century, but the industry went into a steep decline in the middle of the century. Woollen cloth production ended at Guildford in the 1710s, but continued on a small scale in Godalming for around another 100 years.

As the manufacture of woollen cloth declined in Godalming, it was replaced by the production of knitted and woven textiles. A cottage industry developed in the town in the 17th century, producing woollen, silk and later cotton garments. Hosiery was knitted using a stocking frame invented by William Lee in the 1580s. Until the 18th century, most garments were produced by families working at home, but thereafter the industry became increasingly centralised. George Holland set up a factory in around 1790 for the manufacture of "Fleecy and Segovia Hosiery", using specially prepared wool. The Pitchers company was established in the town in 1885 and produced "Charterhouse sweaters", among other woollen items. The firm, which closed in the 1960s, is credited with the invention of a machine to produce the cable stitch.

Leather production was a significant part of the local economy from the mid-15th to mid-20th centuries. Tanneries are recorded at several sites in the town, including at Ockford Road, Meadrow and Catteshall Lock. In 1808, a "bark house" was erected in Mill Street for grinding bark and chamois leather was produced at the Westbrook Mills in the 19th century. The final leather producer in Godalming closed in 1952.

The Godalming area was an important centre for papermaking and, in the early-17th century, several mills in the town produced coarse sheets of "whited brown paper". Papermaking took place at the Westbrook Mills in the 17th and early 18th centuries, and at Catteshall Mill from the 1660s until 1928.

Transport and communications

A ford across the Wey at the site of the current Town Bridge was established by the 12th century. In late-medieval times, there was also a bridge owned by the Lord of the Manor at this location, but the ford was used by townspeople except in times of flood. The road through Godalming between Kingston upon Thames and Petersfield was turnpiked in 1749 and the present Town Bridge was constructed in 1782 by the County Surveyor, George Gwilt. The road south from the town centre through Busbridge to Hascombe was turnpiked in 1826.

The Wey has been used for navigation since ancient times and it is likely that wool, cloth and timber were transported via the unimproved river during the medieval period. The River Wey Navigation, between the River Thames and Guildford was authorised by Act of Parliament in 1651. Although its southern terminus was four miles from the town, the opening of the new waterway had a positive impact on the economy of Godalming. The Wey Navigation Act 1760 authorised the construction of the Godalming Navigation, which opened with four locks in 1764. A  wharf was constructed on the south side of the river, close to the town centre. The busiest period for the navigation was during the 1810s, when timber, flour, and goods made of iron were shipped from Godalming, but after the arrival of the railway in 1845, it went into sharp decline. After 1918, there were only two commercial barges working the river south of Guildford and the final shipments from Godalming took place in 1925. The Godalming Navigation passed to the National Trust in 1968.

The first railway station in Godalming opened in 1847 on the north side of the Wey. The line to Havant was constructed speculatively by the engineer, Thomas Brassley. The  line was initially single track and joined the branch from Guildford to the north of the first railway station. Although construction was completed in 1858, the first passenger trains south of Godalming did not run until January of the following year. The opening of the line necessitated the building of the current railway station, although the original station was retained until 1969 for freight. Farncombe railway station, the only intermediate station between Guildford and Godalming, opened on 1 May 1897. The line south of Godalming was doubled in 1871 and was electrified in 1937.

Late 19th century improvements in the local road network included the construction of Borough Road and Borough Bridge to link the newly opened Charterhouse School to the town centre. The  Guildford and Godalming bypass (now the A3) was opened in July 1934. In the 1990s, Flambard Way was built to divert through traffic around the town centre. Its construction divided Queen Street in two and severed the connections from Mill Lane and Holloway Hill to the High Street.

Residential development
The basic layout of Church Street, the High Street and Bridge Street are thought to have been established by the 13th century and may be pre-conquest in origin. The Saxon settlement was concentrated in the Bridge Street area and Godalming expanded along the modern High Street in the 11th and 12th centuries. The first houses may have been constructed in The Mint in the late 13th or early 14th centuries. The town does not appear to have expanded significantly in early modern period, although the oldest surviving buildings in the centre date from the 16th century. The settlement at Binscombe village grew up in the medieval period around Binscombe Farm. Much of the hamlet, including the original farmhouse, is designated a Conservation Area.

Godalming began to grow in the mid-19th century, catalysed by the opening of the first railway station in 1849 and the arrival of Charterhouse School in 1872. Cottages were constructed in Crownpits in the 1880s and farmland to the south of the town centre was sold for development in the same decade. Summerhouse, Busbridge and Oakdene Roads had been laid out by the mid-1890s and most of the houses were constructed by the end of the century. The area north of Home Farm Road was developed in the 1970s and the Bargate Wood estate was built in the 1980s.

Farncombe began to grow in the early Victorian era, with terraced housing, semi-detached houses and larger villas being built along new streets branching from existing roads such as Hare Lane, Summers Road and Farncombe Street. Until the mid-19th century, Charterhouse and Furze Hill were part of Deanery Farm, although much of the latter was woodland. In 1865, the land was sold in lots, with  being acquired for the site of Charterhouse School. Houses in Deanery and Peperharrow Roads were built in the early 1870s, but in the mid-20th century many were either divided into flats or demolished, and higher-density housing was constructed on their former gardens. In the 1960s, the school vacated its properties on Frith Hill Road and on Markenholm, and the sites were sold for residential development. Housing on The Brambles was constructed in the mid-1980s. The most recent major developments in Farncombe took place in the early 21st century off Furze Lane.

The first council housing in the civil parish was constructed in 1920 around The Oval and Broadwater Lane in Farncombe. The first 168 houses on the Ockford Ridge estate, west of the town centre, were completed in 1931 and were followed by a further 32 new homes on Cliffe Road in 1935. After the Second World War, the Aarons Hill development was built on the site of the former Ockford House. The Binscombe estate was constructed in the 1950s, to the northwest of Farncombe.

Godalming in the world wars
During the First World War, soldiers were billeted at nearby Witley Camp. A canteen was set up in Croft Road for those arriving via Godalming station. Allotments were planted at the Whitehart Field cricket ground and villagers in Busbridge were employed to manufacture baskets for 18 lb high-explosive shells. In October 1914, the Red Cross opened a hospital for wounded soldiers at Charterhouse School.

During the Second World War, the defence of Godalming was the responsibility of the 4th Battalion of the Surrey Home Guard, part of South East Command. A total of 213 bombs fell on the town, including two V-1 flying bombs, although no civilians were killed. In September 1939, around 40 children were evacuated to Busbridge from Wandsworth and several houses in Godalming were requisitioned to provide accommodation for soldiers. St Thomas's Hospital Medical School was also evacuated to Godalming and used the Charterhouse School science laboratories to teach in. Many students joined local home guard. A British Restaurant was opened in Angel Yard and Branksome House, in Filmer Grove, served as a district control centre. The manufacturer, RFD, set up a factory in Catteshall Lane to produce barrage balloons, inflatable boats and life jackets and, by the end of the war, was employing over 1000 local people.

National and local government

UK parliament
The entirety of the Godalming Civil Parish is in the parliamentary constituency of South West Surrey and has been represented at Westminster since May 2005 by Conservative Jeremy Hunt. Between 1984 and 2005, the seat was held by Virginia Bottomley, who was elevated to the House of Lords as Baroness Bottomley of Nettlestone in the year she left the House of Commons.

County Council
Surrey County Council, headquartered in Reigate, is elected every four years. Godalming is represented by two councillors.

Borough Council

The town is divided into five wards; Binscombe, Central and Ockford, Charterhouse, Farncombe and Catteshall, and Holloway. Godalming has 10 representatives governing the Borough of Waverley, headquartered in Godalming:

Godalming Town Council
Godalming Town Council is the lowest tier of local government in the civil parish. A total of 20 councillors is elected every four years. Each year, one councillor is chosen as the Mayor, who represents the town on civic occasions and who is recognised as the principal citizen of Godalming. Godalming is twinned with Mayen, Germany (April 1982) and Joigny, France (May 1985). The town retains strong friendship links with the state of Georgia, USA, and with the cities of Savannah and Augusta in particular, through the organisation, the Friends of Oglethorpe. Since 2011, the town council has held the power to confer the titles of "Honorary Freeman" and "Honorary Freewoman" on residents who have demonstrated outstanding service to or made a significant contribution to the community. As of 2022, two people (Zadie Caudle and John Young) have been recognised in this way.

Demography and housing

Public services

Utilities

For much of the town's history, residents obtained drinking water from local rivers or from wells. In the early 19th century, a hand-operated pump was installed next to the Pepperpot in the High Street. A  well was dug at Charterhouse to supply the school with water. In around 1880, water mains were installed in Godalming and Farncombe, fed from a water tower on Frith Hill. In 1899, the borough council purchased the water tower, becoming responsible for the drinking water supply to the town until 1974. In that year, the water tower was decommissioned and a new covered reservoir was opened at Sandy Lane.

The town sewerage system was constructed in 1894 and included a sewage works at Unstead Farm, to the north of Farncombe. Until this point, waste water had been disposed of in cess pits in the town, resulting in the contamination of drinking water wells and outbreaks of cholera and typhoid are recorded in the 18th and 19th centuries. The municipal tip was opened next to the sewage works in the early 1900s.

The Godalming Gas and Coke Company was established in 1825 and purchased part of Godalming Wharf for the site of its gasworks. Gas was provided for street lighting between 1836 and 1881, and again from 1884 to 1900. The coal required initially arrived by barge, but was delivered by train after the first railway station opened in 1849. The gasworks closed in 1957, when the town supply was linked to that of Guildford.

Godalming has a claim to be the first town in the world to have a combined public and private electricity supply. The price of gas had risen during the 1870s and the borough sought an alternative method of providing street lighting. In 1881, the London firm of Calder and Barrett installed a generator driven by two Poncelet waterwheels at Westbrook Mill. The electricity was used to power three 250 V arc lights at the mill and overhead cables were run above Mill Street to the town centre, where a further four arc lights were installed. A second, 40 V circuit supplied 34 incandescent lamps (of which seven were at the mill and the remainder were in the town centre). The scheme met with mixed success and there were criticisms that the lights in the town centre were too dim, while those at the mill were too bright. By the end of 1881, the generator had been moved to the rear of the White Hart pub, where it was driven by a steam engine and in April of the following year, Siemens took over the operation. The electricity supply continued until 1884, when Siemens refused to bid for the renewal of its contract and the town reverted to gas lighting.

The second power station in Godalming was opened in Borough Road in 1902. By the end of the following year, two 90 kW and one 200 kW steam-powered generators had been installed, which were replaced in 1928 by a 200 kW diesel-driven generator. Under the Electricity (Supply) Act 1926, Godalming was connected to the National Grid, initially to a 33 kV supply ring, which linked the town to Guildford, Hindhead, Woking and Aldershot. In 1932, the ring was connected to the Wimbledon-Woking main via a 132 kV substation at West Byfleet. By the time of its closure in 1949, the Borough Road power station had an installed capacity of 600 kW.

Emergency services
From the early part of the 17th century, the borough appears to have employed a "bedle" or "bellman" to apprehend troublemakers and, in 1747, there is a reference to a "cage prison" in Godalming. By 1762, a uniformed town watchman was employed with an annual salary of £10 and a "constable of Godalming" is first recorded in 1817. The borough police force was formed in 1836 and briefly became part of the county force from 1851 to 1857. By 1868, the police station was in Moss Lane and had three cells capable of holding a total of nine people. The force was led by a superintendent, assisted by a constable, a night watch and several special constables.

In 1889, the borough force became part of the Surrey Constabulary, following the Local Government Act 1888. A new police station, built on the site of the former gasworks, opened in 1969 and closed in 2012. In 2022, policing in the civil parish is the responsibility of Surrey Police and the nearest police station run by the force is at Guildford.

The first fire station in Godalming was constructed in Moss Lane in 1816. It housed a manual fire pump, mounted on a pushcart, that could be used by local residents when the need arose. It was not until 1870 that the town fire brigade was formally constituted, initially as a volunteer force, with the equipment funded by public subscription. Six years later, the station moved to Godalming Wharf and, in 1894, the borough took over the running of the brigade. From this point onwards, the firefighters were paid for each incident that they attended, with costs being paid by each property owner who used their services. In 1904, the borough purchased a horse-drawn steam pump and, in May of the same year, the force moved to a new fire station in Queen Street. During the Second World War, the became part of the National Fire Service and, in 1948, Surrey Fire and Rescue Service was formed. The fire brigade moved to the current station in Bridge Road in 1972.

In 2022, the local fire authority is Surrey County Council and the statutory fire service is the Surrey Fire and Rescue Service. Godalming Ambulance Station, in Catteshall Lane, is run by the South East Coast Ambulance Service.

Healthcare
The Meath Epilepsy Charity was founded in 1892 by Mary Jane Brabazon, Countess of Meath. She purchased Westbrook House and opened the "Home of Comfort for Epileptic Women and Girls". By 1920, The Meath, as it became known, was offering residential care for 87 patients. In 2020, 82 adults with epilepsy were offered residential care and the charity supported an additional 30 clients. Changing Perceptions, in Godalming High Street, is The Meath's social enterprise and offers patients opportunities to work in the furniture workshop and in the café.

The nearest hospital with an A&E is the Royal Surrey County Hospital,  from Godalming. As of 2022, the town has two GP practices, one at Catteshall Mill and one at Binscombe.

Transport

Bus and train

Godalming is linked by a number of bus routes to surrounding towns and villages in southwest Surrey. Operators serving the town include Compass Bus, Stagecoach and the Compo Community Bus.

South Western Railway operates all services from both  and Farncombe stations. Trains run to  via  and to   via . There is a taxi rank at Godalming station.

River navigation

The River Wey is navigable from Godalming northwards to Weybridge and the navigation authority is the National Trust.

Long-distance cycleway and footpath
The Farnham Link of the Surrey Cycleway runs through the civil parish from Charterhouse via the town centre to Holloway Hill. The final stage of the Tour of Britain 2012 passed through Godalming.

The Fox Way, a  footpath that encircles Guildford, follows the towpath of the Wey Navigation from Catteshall to Town Bridge, before running north of the town centre and Aaron's Hill towards Eashing.

Localities

Catteshall
Catteshall is a directly attached neighbourhood and commercial estate in the east of Godalming civil parish, formerly a hamlet between Godalming and the villages of Unstead and Thorncombe Street. It incorporates another previously distinct but now largely forgotten hamlet called Langham. Catteshall Manor is at the top of the hill and the former Ram Cider House at the bottom. Its name is first attested c. 1130 and likely derives from the Old English for ‘wild cat hill’. Two buildings are listed: Ram Cider House and Catteshall Grange, as the manor house is on the higher land now in Busbridge Civil Parish.

Catteshall houses high-tech firms such as Cloud Computing Provider MTI Technology, the business data specialists The Content Group, and the new Surrey Data Park, home to Aegis Data Centre.

Binscombe

Formerly a hamlet distinct from Farncombe and with closer links to Compton, Binscombe expanded significantly from the 1950s onwards with the addition of the Binscombe Housing Estate. It predates both Godalming and Farncombe as a settlement, originating in the Iron Age if not earlier, and continuing into the Roman era as a likely villa site with an associated cemetery. As such it may have had links with the Compton Roman villa and the Roman temple at Wanborough, and so have constituted a comparative local hub within sparsely settled Roman Surrey. Continuity between this and later Saxon settlement is not clear.

The name Binscombe, deriving from 'Budenscumbe' or Bȳda's/Bȳden's valley, is first attested in 1227. A notable manorial lord of Binscombe (traditionally linked with the Westbrook estate in Godalming) was Theophilus Oglethorpe (1650–1702), soldier, MP and Jacobite, of Westbrook Place.

'Binscombe Farm' is of at least medieval origin. Quaker leader George Fox is said to have preached in Binscombe, presumably in the Farm, which was then owned by a noted local adherent - hence 'Fox's Barn'. Adjacent to it and marked by a plaque is a Quaker burial ground in use from 1660 to 1790. A number of other nearby houses date from the 16th century or before. Binscombe's centre is designated a conservation area of special architectural or historic interest.

An indirect casualty of the First World War, Charles Wheatley of the Royal Field Artillery, died during a training exercise accident in the field below Binscombe Ridge on 15 March 1915, aged 28. He is buried in Eashing Cemetery.

Binscombe has a church which opened in 1965, a school, a doctors' surgery and adjacent pharmacy, and a parade of shops, including a dentist's and dog groomer's. It appears never to have had a public house, although an "off-sales beerhouse" opened in the late 19th century, gradually evolving into a village shop, which closed in 1964. However, the White Hart in Bourne Road can be said to be within Binscombe's boundaries.

Education

Early schools

There are thought to have been dame schools operating in Godalming in the 16th and 17th centuries, but the first surviving reference to formal education in the town is from 1715, in which a school for 50 poor boys is recorded. The National school opened in Mint Road in February 1813 and moved to the former workhouse in Moss Lane in 1843. The workhouse buildings were demolished in 1910 and new classrooms were constructed on the same site. The school moved to new premises on Franklyn Road in the early 1970s and was renamed to become St Mark's School. A further change of name took place in 2008 and the school is now known as Green Oak School.

A British school opened in Hart's Yard in December 1812, but moved to Bridge Road in February the following year. It educated children between the ages of 6 and 13. The premises were rebuilt in 1872 and are now occupied by the Busy Bees nursery school. Busbridge School was founded in 1865 and three years later it became a National school. In 1868 there were 64 children on the roll, but by 1906, the school had 166 pupils.

St John's School, Farncombe opened in 1856; both the George Road and Meadrow Schools opened in 1906. Moss Lane County Primary School opened on the former workhouse site in 1975, but became an infants school in 1994.

Maintained schools

Broadwater School, in the north of the civil parish, was established in 1967. It was built on part of the former Broadwater House estate. The school educates around 570 pupils aged from 11 to 16. It became part of the Greenshaw Learning Trust in September 2020.

Godalming College, to the south of the town centre, was founded in 1975 on the campus of the former Godalming Grammar School. It caters for 16–19-year-olds and is state maintained. Awarded Beacon status in 2006, it was the best performing state school for AS/A levels in the Surrey area in 2004; its Ofsted report for 2005 graded the college as "outstanding" in six of the seven key areas and "good" in the 7th.

Independent schools

Charterhouse School was founded in 1611 in a former Carthusian monastery near Smithfield in London and relocated to Godalming in 1872. The main school buildings were designed by the architect, Philip Charles Hardwick, and the chapel, by Giles Gilbert Scott, was erected in 1927 as a memorial to former pupils who had died in the First World War. Initially the school was for boys only but, from 1971, girls were accepted into the sixth form. Girls were first admitted into Year 9 in 2021 and the school is expected to become fully coeducational in September 2023.

St Hilary's School is an independent preparatory school for boys 2½–7 (around 90) and girls 2½–11 (around 200). It was founded in Tuesley Lane in August 1927 and moved to its present site on Holloway Hill in 1936. The nursery department opened in 1946 and the school became a limited company in 1965.

Community

Places of worship

The Parish Church of St Peter and St Paul's meets in a Grade I listed building. It has an early Saxon chancel and a Norman tower. The Roman Catholic, Quaker, and Unitarian places of worship, the former Congregational chapel, and former Salvation Army hall are all Grade II listed buildings. Godalming currently contains places of worship belonging to five denominations:
Busbridge Church is an evangelical Anglican Church in Busbridge on the southern hill of Godalming.
Godalming Baptist Church is a Baptist church in the centre of Godalming.
St Edmund's is the Roman Catholic parish church, on a hillside off Flambard Way, near the town centre.
Godalming Friends Meeting House is a Quaker place of worship.
Meadrow Unitarian Chapel is on the outskirts of the town in Meadrow.

Music and theatre
Godalming Band has been active in its current form since 1937, there having been a previous town band established in 1844. The main band and Youth Band play at various community events and concerts throughout the year, some at the town's bandstand, in aid of the band and other local charities.
The amateur Godalming Theatre Group puts on three shows a year at the Ben Travers Theatre, Charterhouse School, Godalming: a spring musical, an autumn drama or comedy, and a Christmas pantomime or show. It also runs a youth theatre group.

Community centres
The Denningberg Centre for the Elderly is named after Danny Denningberg (1923−2011), a local politician granted the Honorary Freedom of the Borough of Waverley in 2007. Denningberg was a community activist and fund-raiser who served on Godalming Borough Council in 1954 and then again from 1963 continuously through the formation of Waverley until 2003, when he retired. Denningberg was also Mayor of Godalming and Mayor of Waverley at times during his public career.
The Wilfrid Noyce Community Centre in Godalming is named after Wilfrid Noyce (1917–1962), a master at Charterhouse and a mountaineer, who was on the expedition that made the first ascent of Mount Everest in 1953.
The Clockhouse, or Milford and Villages Day Centre, is a day centre for people over 50. The money to build it in 1997 was raised from charitable donations and local fundraising.

Godalming is home to The National Autistic Society (NAS) resource centre for the south east and the NAS horizons day centre.

In popular culture
In Charles Dickens' novel Nicholas Nickleby, Nicholas and Smike stay the night in Godalming, en route from London to Portsmouth: "To Godalming they came at last, and here they bargained for two humble beds, and slept soundly."
The comic novel The Return of Reginald Perrin, by David Nobbs, contains the following: "Note: It is believed that this book mentions Godalming more than any other book ever written, including A Social, Artistic and Economic History of Godalming by E. Phipps-Blythburgh."
 Ian Fleming's James Bond short story, Quantum of Solace, referred to Godalming as a venue for retired colonial civil servants with memories of postings to places "that no one at the local golf club would have heard about or would care about."
Much of the action in Bulldog Drummond by Sapper takes place in Godalming.
In The Rose of Tibet (1962) by thriller writer, Lionel Davidson, two characters are described as talking "for hours" of a shared link with Godalming. In a somewhat "backhanded compliment", their exotic (and perilous) Tibetan location is held to be "All a long, long way from damp, soft Godalming with its mushy autumnal leaves underfoot and its dark green trains commuting to Waterloo."
Binscombe features as a location in The Hog's Back Mystery (1933) by the detective-fiction writer Freeman Wills Crofts. Binscombe is also the nominal setting for John Whitbourn's The Binscombe Tales (1998 onwards), a multi-volume Twilight Zone style story collection.

The 2006 romantic comedy film, The Holiday, and the 2022 television series, Inside Man, include scenes filmed in Godalming.

Sport

Leisure centre
Godalming Leisure Centre at Broadwater Park was opened in 2012, replacing the previous centre dating from the 1970s. It offers a 25 m pool, a teaching pool a fitness gym, a sauna and a soft play area.

Association football
Godalming Town F.C. was founded as Godalming United F.C. in 1950 by former pupils of Godalming Grammar School. Originally, the team played its home games at the Holloway Hill Recreation Ground, but moved to Meadrow in Farncombe in 1970. The current stadium is named in memory of Bill Kyte, a former president and longstanding supporter of the club.

Old Carthusians F.C. was founded in 1876 by a group of former pupils of Charterhouse School. The team won the FA Cup in 1881 and the FA Amateur Cup three times in the 1890s. In 2022, the club is a member of the Arthurian League and the first team plays its home games at the school playing fields.

Other sports
 Godalming Angling Society was founded in 1881 and has fishing rights to six lakes and the River Wey from Lower Eashing to Guildford.
Cricket has been played in Godalming since at least 1767.
Godalming Cricket Club plays at the Holloway Hill Recreation Ground.
Farncombe Cricket Club
Guildford Rugby Club (formed in 2002 by the merger of Guildford & Godalming RFC and Old Guildfordians RFC) plays in the London 2 South West league at the Broadwater Sports Club in Godalming.
Guildford Hockey Club is based at Broadwater School. The men's 1XI compete in the England Hockey League. 
Flat Green Lawn Bowls: Godalming and Farncombe Bowls Club plays at the Burys in central Godalming, Holloway Hill Bowls Club at Holloway Recreation Ground, and Milford Bowls Club at Chapel Lane, Milford.
Several Contract Bridge clubs play at various venues in the town.

Notable buildings and landmarks

Godalming civil parish has 138 listed buildings, of which 82 are within the town centre itself, and 18 of which are monuments. These include Tudor timber framed buildings, 17th-century brickwork buildings and a wide selection of other buildings. One of its most famous landmarks is 'The Pepperpot' which is Godalming's old town hall.

Significant buildings in the town include Charterhouse, which stands  from the town centre, on Charterhouse Hill, which is half-separated from Frith Hill by a steep ravine. Its main building is Grade II listed and the chapel, built by Sir Giles Gilbert Scott, is Grade II* listed.

Town halls
The 19th-century town hall, nicknamed The Pepperpot due to its cupola, is a distinctive octagonal building in the High Street. Its uniqueness has made it emblematic of the town. Built in 1814, it took over from the medieval Old Market House, which had held the site since the early Middle Ages. It was in this Market House and its predecessors that the local Hundred Court met and discussed local matters for over a thousand years. The upstairs rooms continued to be used for civic gatherings until 1908. The Pepperpot later housed the town museum and continues to be used as a public function room. The arched area at street level has been used as a market place. Its successor, Godalming Borough Hall, fronts onto Bridge Street.

Godalming Museum

Godalming Museum was formed in 1921 and was originally located in the Pepperpot. In the 1980s, it moved to 109 High Street, a timber-framed Wealden House dating from the 1440s. The museum houses numerous artefacts relating to the history of the local area and the Arts and Crafts movement in southwest Surrey.

Jack Phillips memorial cloister and gardens
The radio operator of RMS Titanic, Jack Phillips, was born and lived in Farncombe, worked in Godalming and was then at sea. He is famed for remaining at his post, sending repeated distress calls, until the ship sank. Phillips is remembered in several ways around the town, including a section of Godalming Museum, a memorial fountain, a cloister and garden walk near the church, and a public house named in his honour.

The Red House 
The Red House, on Frith Hill, was built in 1899 by architect Edwin Lutyens for a retired housemaster of Charterhouse School. It is constructed of red brick in a Flemish bond with a plain tile roof and leaded-light windows. Its position, on a sloping hillside, required the front of the building to have two storeys, but the rear has four. The principal internal feature is the central, open-well staircase and the original decoration on the handrail is still visible. The Red House has been described as "an early seminal work by Lutyens".

Wyatt's Almshouses

Wyatt's Almshouses were built in 1622 for Richard Wyatt, the Master Carpenter of the Carpenters' Company in London. Wyatt stipulated that accommodation should be offered to ten poor men of the parishes of Godalming, Puttenham, Hambledon, Compton and Dunsfold. A chapel was also provided for the use of residents. The ten dwellings were converted into eight apartments in 1959 and new bungalows surrounding the original building were added in the 1960s.

Parks and open spaces

Broadwater Park
The  Broadwater Park is a mixed-use recreation ground to the northeast of Farncombe. For much of its history, the area was owned by the More Molyneux family of Loseley House and the first record of cricket being played there is from 1827. The estate, including the cricket ground, was sold in 1836 to the timber merchant, George Marshall, for the site of Broadwater House. The property remained in the Marshall family until the early 20th century, when it was bought by George Edward Price, a director of the Canadian firm, Price Brothers Ltd. During the First World War, the house was used to accommodate Belgian refugees and the lake was used as an ice rink by Canadian soldiers, who were billeted at Witley Camp.

In 1936, the estate was purchased by Mr W. Hoptroff, a local builder, who in turn offered some of the land to the borough for use as a recreation area. In 2022, the park is owned by the borough council and includes areas of woodland and grassland, a multi-use games area, football pitches and tennis courts.

Lammas Lands
The Lammas Lands are a  area of floodplain on the north bank of the River Wey between the town centre and Farncombe. From medieval times until the early 19th century, the area was managed as a hay meadow and, once the grass had been cut around Lammas Day (1 August), local residents were permitted to graze their cattle until Candlemas (1 February) the following year. These rights of common were extinguished in with the 1808 Act of Inclosure, but at least two of the dole stones, which formerly denoted individual plots of land, survive. Today the Lammas Lands are designated a Site of Nature Conservation Interest and are mostly owned by the borough council. A 1994 survey noted the presence of over 108 species of flowering plants, including black knapweed, meadow saxifrage, marsh marigold and water mint. Some 227 types of invertebrate were recorded in 2001, including populations of reed beetle on the banks of the Wey, whirligig beetle in Hell Ditch and click beetle in areas with taller grasses.

Notable people
See also alumni of Godalming Grammar School and List of notable Old Carthusians

 Jonas Moore (16171679) mathematician, surveyor and ordnance officer  died at Godalming
 John Balchen (16701744) Admiral of the White, Royal Navy  was born and lived in Godalming until he joined the navy at the age of 15
 James Oglethorpe (16961785) army officer and founder of the Colony of Georgia  was born in Godalming and lived at Westbrook Place
 Mary Toft (1763) convinced medical professionals that she had given birth to rabbits  born, lived and died in Godalming
 Owen Manning (17211801) clergyman and historian of Surrey  was vicar of Godalming from 1763 until his death
 George Barrett (17521821) actuary  lived in Godalming from 1816 until his death
 James Inskipp (17901868) artist  lived for the latter part of his life in Catteshall Lane
 Joseph Dando (18061894) violinist and viola player  lived at Attwell Cottage, Peperharow Road from 1875 until his death
 Alfred Russel Wallace (18231913) biologist and critic  lived in Godalming from 1881 to 1889
 Julius Caesar (18301878) cricketer  born, lived and died in Godalming
 Thomas Page (18501936) classicist and schoolmaster  served for 30 years on Godalming Town Council, was a founder of Godalming Grammar School, died at his home on Frith Hill
 Philip Cardew (18511910 army officer in the Royal Engineers and pioneer of electrical engineering  died at Crownpits House, Godalming
 Ernest Irving (18781953) musical director and composer  born and lived in Godalming as a child
 George Mallory (18861924) teacher and mountaineer  lived at Frith Hill from 1910 until his death
 W. H. C. Romanis (18891972) surgeon and medical author  was born in Godalming and spent his childhood in the town
 Aldous Huxley (18941963) writer and philosopher  was born at Laleham, Peperharow Road and spent his childhood in Godalming
 Milicent Bagot (19072006) British intelligence officer  lived at Jubilee Nursing Home from 2001 until her death
 Nick Clarke (19482006) broadcaster  was born in the town
 Elspeth Beard (b. 1959) architect and motorcyclist  lives and works in Godalming

Notes

References

Bibliography

External links

Godalming Town Council
Godalming Museum 
Godalming aerial photographs
www.geograph.co.uk : photos of Godalming and surrounding area

Godalming
Towns in Surrey
Market towns in Surrey